The second Women's Islamic Games took place in Tehran, Iran, in 1997. Twenty-one countries were represented at the Games with a total of 748 athletes, 95 teams, 290 judges and 8 international observers in attendance. Host Iran won the Games with an overall total of 150 medals.

Participants

Sports

Some of the sports competed at the 1997 Games include: athletics, badminton, fencing, handball, judo, swimming and volleyball.

Medal table

Women's Islamic Games, 1997
Women's Islamic Games
Wom
Multi-sport events in Iran
International sports competitions hosted by Iran
Sport in Tehran
Women's Islamic Games
20th century in Tehran
1997 in women's sport